Intan Jaya Regency is one of the regencies (kabupaten) in the Indonesian province of Central Papua; it was formed in 2008 from part of Paniai Regency. It covers an area of 3,922 km2, and had a population of 40,490 at the 2010 Census, but this greatly increased to 135,043 at the 2020 Census. The administrative centre is Sugapa.

Administrative Districts
Intan Jaya Regency comprised in 2010 six districts (distrik), tabulated below with their populations at the 2010 Census: 

By 2018, two further districts have been created since 2010 - Tomosiga and Ugimba. The eight districts are tabulated below with their areas and their populations at the 2020 Census. The table also includes the location of the district administrative centres, and the number of administrative villages (rural desa and urban kelurahan) in each district.

References

External links
Statistics publications from Statistics Indonesia (BPS)

Regencies of Central Papua